Scott Leung Man-kwong,  (born 3 August 1984) is a Hong Kong politician of the Kowloon West New Dynamic who is the elected Legislative Council member for Kowloon West.

Electoral history

References 

Living people
1984 births
District councillors of Sham Shui Po District
HK LegCo Members 2022–2025
Hong Kong pro-Beijing politicians